United in Regret is the second studio album released by the death metal band Arsis. This album has Noah Martin on session bass as opposed to James Malone, and features a guest guitar solo by Emil Werstler of Chimaira and Dååth on "The Things You Said." United in Regret received favorable reviews from press worldwide, including The Village Voice, Pop Matters, Metal Review, and Metal Maniacs magazine.

Track listing
All songs written by James Malone, except where noted.
 "Oh, the Humanity" - 4:25
 "...And the Blind One Came" - 5:03
 "United in Regret" - 3:47
 "I Speak Through Shadows" - 4:06
 "Lust Before the Maggots Conquest" - 4:47
 "The Marriage Bed" - 3:15
 "The Cold Resistance" - 3:48
 "The Things You Said" (Depeche Mode cover) - 3:23
 "Hopeless Truth" - 3:54

Credits

Personnel
James Malone - vocals, guitars
Mike Van Dyne - drums
Noah Martin - bass

Additional personnel
Emil Werstler - guitar solo (track 8)

Production
Brett Portzer - engineering (drums)
Eyal Levi - engineering, mixing
Scott Hull - mastering
Mark Riddick - artwork, layout

References

2006 albums
Arsis albums
Willowtip Records albums
Candlelight Records albums